Starý Hrádok is a village and municipality in the Levice District in the Nitra Region of Slovakia.

History
In historical records the village was first mentioned in 1239.

Geography
The village lies at an altitude of 148 metres and covers an area of 6.568 km². It has a population of about 170 people.

Ethnicity
The village is approximately 87% Slovak and 13% Magyar.

Facilities
The village has a public library and tennis court.

External links
http://www.statistics.sk/mosmis/eng/run.html

Villages and municipalities in Levice District